The list of colloquial expressions in Honduras (hondureñismos) are Spanish expressions that are unique to Honduras.

In 1899,  published the first dictionary with the title "Hondureñismos. Provincial Vocabulary of Honduras." It contains mostly the words and expressions in La Botica Village, a book by Francisco Cruz Castro. In the 22nd edition of the Dictionary of the Royal Spanish Academy, in 2001, the Academia Hondureña de la Lengua contributed 2,782 words in 1992.

Hondureñismos
Bululo: Bread roll (La Ceiba)
Cipote/a: boy/girl
Güirro/a: boy/girl
Trucha: Corner shop

References

Spanish language in North America
Languages of Honduras